Holcocera is a gelechoid moth genus of the family Blastobasidae. There are about 70 described species.

Taxonomy
The genera Hypatopa and Calosima are sometimes treated as synonyms of Holcocera.

Species

Holcocera aclydis
Holcocera adjutrix Meyrick, 1918
Holcocera amicae
Holcocera amicitiae
Holcocera anomalella
Holcocera arcae
Holcocera audaciae
Holcocera aurorae
Holcocera basiplagata Walsingham, 1912
Holcocera bucinae
Holcocera calthae
Holcocera cathedrae
Holcocera cerradicola
Holcocera chalcofrontella
Holcocera chloropeda Meyrick, 1922
Holcocera coccivorella
Holcocera concolor
Holcocera crassicornella
Holcocera cryptae
Holcocera cylindrota Meyrick, 1918
Holcocera digesta Meyrick, 1922
Holcocera dominae
Holcocera epitomae
Holcocera eusaris Meyrick, 1922
Holcocera extensa
Holcocera famae
Holcocera fergusoni Adamski, 2004
Holcocera fugae
Holcocera gargantuella
Holcocera gigantella
Holcocera gozmanyi Adamski & Landry, 2007
Holcocera grenadensis
Holcocera guilandinae
Holcocera hemiteles Walsingham, 1912
Holcocera homochromatica Walsingham, 1912
Holcocera ianuae
Holcocera iceryaeella
Holcocera immaculella
Holcocera increta Meyrick, 1930
Holcocera irroratella
Holcocera iubae
Holcocera laudis
Holcocera lignyodes
Holcocera limicola Meyrick, 1922
Holcocera luxuriae
Holcocera lyrae
Holcocera macrotoma Meyrick, 1916
Holcocera mortis
Holcocera musicae
Holcocera nephalia Walsingham, 1912
Holcocera notae
Holcocera nuptae
Holcocera panurgella
Holcocera paradoxa
Holcocera percnoscia Meyrick, 1932
Holcocera piratae
Holcocera plagatola
Holcocera poetae
Holcocera portae
Holcocera puellae
Holcocera pugionaria Meyrick, 1918
Holcocera sakura Ohshima, 2003
Holcocera sollertiae
Holcocera subolivacea (Walsingham, 1897)
Holcocera sympasta Meyrick, 1918
Holcocera titanica Walsingham, 1912
Holcocera villella
Holcocera zonae

Former species
Holcocera anthracographa Meyrick, 1937
Holcocera aphanes (Zeller, 1877)
Holcocera controversella (Zeller, 1877)
Holcocera orthophrontis Meyrick, 1932
Holcocera proagorella (Zeller, 1877)
Holcocera suppletella (Zeller, 1877)

References

 , 2000: A new North American Calosima (Lepidoptera: Coleophoridae: Blastobasinae). Tropical Lepidoptera Research 11 (1-2): 46-48.
 , 2002: Blastobasinae (Lepidoptera: Gelechioidea: Coleophoridae) of Thailand, Part 1. Four new species of Calosima Dietz, 1910. Insecta Koreana 19 (3-4): 233-239.
 , 2009, A new Holcocera Clemens from Guatemala and redescription of H. iceryaeella (Riley) from the United States (Lepidoptera: Coleophoridae: Blastobasinae: Holcocerini): Two congeners with incidental preference for avocado, Proc. Entomol. Soc. Wash. 111 (1): 254-262.
 , 1996: An annotated list of North American Blastobasinae (Lepidoptera: Gelechioidea: Coleophoridae). Proceedings of the Entomological Society of Washington 98 (4): 708-740.
 , 2003: A new Holcocera Clemens (Lepidoptera: Gelechioidea: Coleophoridae: Holcocerini) associated with Pinaceae in North America. Proceedings of the Entomological Society of Washington 105 (1): 144-148.
 , 2010: A review of African Blastobasinae (Lepidoptera: Gelechioidea: Coleophoridae), with new taxa reared from native fruits in Kenya. Smithsonian contributions to Zoology 630': 1-68. Full article: .

 
Blastobasidae genera